Parlok is a European manufacturer of mudguards and spray-suppression systems for the commercial vehicle industry. Its products are sold throughout the world via national distributors. Main product line of Parlok is the Supra spray-suppression system. Parlok's other products include toolboxes and other plastic products.

Parlok Supra spray-suppression system fulfills the requirements of EU-directives and it has been granted the type approval number e1*109/2011*109/2011*0018*00 by Kraftfahrt-Bundesamt.

Oy Parlok Ab is ISO-certified for its quality and environmental policy (ISO 9001:2008, ISO 14001:2004).

References

External links
 Official website

Manufacturing companies of Finland
Automotive companies of Finland
Pargas